Delabar State Park is an Illinois state park on  in Henderson County, Illinois, United States. The park officially opened in 1960 and was named after the two brothers, Roy and Jack Delabar, who donated the site of the park in 1959.

References

State parks of Illinois
Protected areas of Henderson County, Illinois
Protected areas on the Mississippi River
Protected areas established in 1960
1960 establishments in Illinois